"Screaming in the Night" is a power ballad by Swiss hard rock band Krokus. The song was released as the second single from the band's seventh studio album Headhunter. The single was originally released in 1983 in 7" and 12" formats with a special edition 12" single being released in 1986 to promote the live album Alive and Screamin'. The song peaked at #21 on the Billboard Mainstream Rock chart in July 1983 and remained on the chart for 12 weeks. At the time of its release, "Screaming in the Night" was the band's biggest hit to date. The song remains one of the band's most popular and still receives airplay on American classic rock radio stations.

Music video
A music video was released in 1983 and was put in rotation on MTV.

A live music video was released for the song to promote the 1986 single release.

Track listing
7" single

1983 12" single

1986 12" single

Personnel

Headhunter version
 Marc Storace – vocals
 Fernando von Arb – lead guitar
 Mark Kohler – rhythm guitar
 Chris von Rohr – bass
 Steve Pace – drums
 Jimi Jamison - backing vocals

Alive and Screamin' version
 Marc Storace – vocals
 Fernando von Arb – lead guitar
 Mark Kohler – rhythm guitar
 Tommy Keiser – bass
 Jeff Klaven – drums

References

1980s ballads
1983 singles
1983 songs
Arista Records singles
Hard rock ballads
Songs about nights